Malcolm Evans may refer to:

 Sir Malcolm Evans (academic lawyer), British jurist
 Malcolm Evans (cartoonist), New Zealand cartoonist
 Malcolm Evans (computer programmer), British computer programmer
 Mal Evans, road manager for The Beatles